Myrmecia analis is a species of the genus Myrmecia. Myrmecia analis is usually only found in Western Australia. It was described by Mayr in 1862.

Myrmecia analis are around 20-22 millimetres long on average, but some workers can be slightly smaller, and have the colour tone similar to Myrmecia vindex, but the head is slightly darker. The mandibles are around 3-4 millimeters long.

References

Myrmeciinae
Hymenoptera of Australia
Insects described in 1862
Insects of Australia